Ann Hughes (born 1960), is a female former judoka who competed for Great Britain and England.

Judo career
Hughes won the 1986 World Championship gold medal, a bronze medal in 1987 and a silver medal in 1989. She represented England and won a bronze medal in the 56 kg lightweight category, at the 1990 Commonwealth Games in Auckland, New Zealand. In 1986, she also won the gold medal in the 56kg weight category at the judo demonstration sport event as part of the 1986 Commonwealth Games.

She is also a three times champion of Great Britain, winning the light-middleweight division at the British Judo Championships in 1982 and 1982 and the open class in 1984.

References

External links
 

1960 births
English female judoka
Commonwealth Games medallists in judo
Commonwealth Games bronze medallists for England
Judoka at the 1990 Commonwealth Games
Living people
Medallists at the 1990 Commonwealth Games